Bubble Gang is a Philippine television sketch comedy show broadcast by GMA Network. Directed by Frasco Mortiz, it stars Michael V. It premiered on October 20, 1995 on the network's Friday night line up replacing Vilma. The show is the longest running comedy show in the Philippines.

The series is streaming online on YouTube.

Premise
The show emphasizes pop culture parody. Skits and sketches are performed in a manner similar to variety shows. It also spoofs other television shows, adverts, and famous people.

Overview
Bubble Gang premiered on GMA Network on October 20, 1995. It was inspired by the gag show Tropang Trumpo. The original cast consisted of Ogie Alcasid, Antonio Aquitania, Sunshine Cruz, Jackie de Guzman, Assunta De Rossi, Eric Fructuoso, Susan Lozada, Aiko Melendez, Wendell Ramos and Michael V. Production personnel of the show, Diego Llorico and Marissa "Mykah" Flores later joined the show as cast members.

In March 2020, principal photography was halted due to the enhanced community quarantine in Luzon caused by the COVID-19 pandemic. The show resumed its programming on August 21, 2020.

Cast

 Michael V. 
 Diego Llorico 
 Paolo Contis 
 Chariz Solomon 
 Betong Sumaya 
 Sef Cadayona 
 Valeen Montenegro 
 Archie Alemania 
 Analyn Barro 
 Faye Lorenzo 
 Kokoy de Santos 
 Tuesday Vargas 
 Kim de Leon 
 Dasuri Choi 

Former cast
 Antonio Aquitania 
 Ogie Alcasid 
 Wendell Ramos 
 Susan Lozada 
 Aiko Melendez 
 Sunshine Cruz 
 Eric Fructuoso 
 Jackie de Guzman 
 Maricar de Mesa 
 Assunta de Rossi 
 Alma Concepcion 
 Shirley Fuentes 
 Myka Flores 
 Amanda Page 
 Luis Alandy 
 Aya Medel 
 Sherwin Ordoñez 
 Ara Mina 
 Toni Gonzaga 
 Sharmaine Arnaiz 
 Sherilyn Reyes-Tan 
 Wowie de Guzman 
 Angelika Dela Cruz 
 Trina Zuñiga 
 Kevin Vernal 
 Rufa Mae Quinto 
 Maureen Larrazabal 
 Boy 2 Quizon 
 Diana Zubiri 
 Francine Prieto 
 Jacky Woo 
 Rodfill Obeso 
 James Ronald Obeso 
 Jackie Rice 
 Ellen Adarna 
 Gwen Zamora 
 Sam Pinto 
 Max Collins 
 Carla Abellana 
 Joyce Ching 
 RJ Padilla 
 Jan Manual 
 Mikael Daez 
 Andrea Torres 
 Juancho Trivino 
 Denise Barbacena 
 Arny Ross 
 Kim Domingo 
 Arra San Agustin 
 Jak Roberto 
 Lovely Abella 
 Mikoy Morales 
 Ashley Rivera 
 Liezel Lopez

Timeline

Recurring characters and segments

Home media release
The series was released on DVD by GMA Music in 2009. The DVD contained "the best of the best" episodes of Bubble Gang throughout the years.

Controversies
In September 2002, the show was sued by L.A. Lopez after the show made a character named as Ala Ey Lopez in 2001. According to Lopez, the spoof affected him emotionally. He asked 5 million pesos for damages and a public apology from the show. The case was later dismissed.

In 2013, Michael V., Rufa Mae Quinto, and GMA Network's executives, were summoned by the Movie and Television Review and Classification Board chairman, Eugenio Villareal for a mandatory conference after a sexually sensitive comedy sketch called "The Adventures of Susie Lualhati" which aired on November 29, 2013. Villareal was alarmed after what he had found of a derogatory and discriminatory portrayal of a woman in the show. Michael V., Quinto, and executives of the network met with MTRCB on December 9, 2013 to discuss the issue. It led to an agreement that the show will implement proposed measures that will ensure audiences about gender-sensitivity contents by December 16, 2013.

Accolades

Spin-offs
 Bubble Gang Jr. premiered on May 8, 2005 and featured child actors.
 DoSeNa, a television film to celebrate the show's 12th anniversary. 
 Bungallow, a horror television film to celebrate the show's 15th anniversary.
 Yaya and Angelina: The Spoiled Brat Movie, a film based on the segment Ang Spoiled. It was released in theaters on September 23, 2009.
 Boy Pick-Up: The Movie, a film based on the character Boy Pick-Up from the Pick-Up Lines segment. It was released on theaters on June 6, 2012.
 Hole in the Wall, a Philippine version of the American game show series of the same title aired in 2009. Hosted by Yaya and Angelina - two characters created by Bubble Gang were portrayed by Michael V. and Ogie Alcasid respectively.

Notes

  YouTube comedy duo, more popularly known as "Moymoy Palaboy", that gained fame after recording and lip syncing songs. The duo now became part of the show in 2009, where they debuted with their own segment, "Iyotube" parodying the video sharing website YouTube.
  Recent additions to the show, known collectively as the "Bubblets."
  Diego Llorico is also a segment producer for the show.
  Salvador, Cosme, and Francisco are the trio that was well known with the "Ang Dating Doon" which aired from 1998 to 2000 and 2005. In 2011, the segment was revived with the trio reprising their roles as Brothers Pete, Willie, and Jocel.
  Newest additions to the comedy show. They were introduced on August 2, 2013. They are collectively known as the "Bagong Gang".

References

External links
 
 

1995 Philippine television series debuts
Filipino-language television shows
GMA Network original programming
Philippine comedy television series
Philippine television sketch shows
Television productions suspended due to the COVID-19 pandemic
Television controversies in the Philippines